Great Sandy Island may refer to:

 K'gari (Fraser Island), formerly known briefly as Great Sandy Island
 Great Sandy Island (Western Australia), an island off the Pilbara coast